Zhang Ting is a Paralympian athlete from China competing mainly in category T54 sprint events.

She competed in the 2008 Summer Paralympics in Beijing, China. There she won a gold medal in the women's T53-54 4 x 100 metres relay as part of the Chinese team. She also competed in the T54 100m and 200m finishing fifth and fourth respectively

External links
 

Paralympic athletes of China
Athletes (track and field) at the 2008 Summer Paralympics
Paralympic gold medalists for China
Living people
Chinese female sprinters
Year of birth missing (living people)
Medalists at the 2008 Summer Paralympics
Paralympic medalists in athletics (track and field)
21st-century Chinese women